The 2017 Louisiana–Monroe Warhawks baseball team represents the University of Louisiana at Monroe in the 2017 NCAA Division I baseball season. The Warhawks play their home games at Warhawk Field.

Schedule and results
Louisiana–Monroe announced its 2017 football schedule on December 16, 2016. The 2017 schedule consists of 23 home and 33 away games in the regular season. The Warhawks will host Sun Belts foes Coastal Carolina, Little Rock, Louisiana, South Alabama, and Texas–Arlington and will travel to Arkansas State, Georgia Southern, Georgia State, Texas State, and Troy.

The 2017 Sun Belt Conference Championship will be contested May 24–28 in Statesboro, Georgia, and will be hosted by Georgia Southern.

 Rankings are based on the team's current  ranking in the Collegiate Baseball poll.

References

Louisiana-Monroe
Louisiana–Monroe Warhawks baseball seasons
Louis